Hugues Quester (born 5 August 1948) is a French actor. He has appeared in more than 60 films and television shows since 1969. He starred in Raúl Ruiz's 1983 film City of Pirates.

Selected filmography
 Mr. Freedom (1969)
 La rose de fer (1973, as "Pierre Dupont")
 Je t'aime moi non plus (1976)
 L'Adolescente (1978)
 Dickie-roi (1981)
 Julien Fontanes, magistrat (1982)
 City of Pirates (1983)
 Parking  (1985)
 No Man's Land (1985)
 Hôtel du Paradis (1986)
 Anne Trister (1986)
 Hard to Be a God (1989)
 A Tale of Springtime (1990)
 La Chambre obscure (2000)

References

External links

Official Website

1948 births
Living people
People from Maine-et-Loire
French male film actors
French male television actors